Multi-layered packaging are multilayer or composite materials using innovative technologies aimed to give barrier properties, strength and storage stability to food items, new materials as well as hazardous materials.

Multiple layers are formed by coextrusion, lamination
, or various coating technologies.  The material of construction of multilayered packaging ranges from paper to plastics to metals. Most multilayered packages are not readily recyclable. Basf company and Uflex recently developed multilayered food packaging from 100% recyclable materials.

History of multilayered packaging dates back to the late 1950s when Procter & Gamble first designed multilayered collapsible tubes for toothpastes. 
Amine group containing products deforms HDPE on storage, and are incapable of arresting amine odours. Multilayered CO-EX bottles are the best packaging solution for such products.

Types

Multiwall paper sacks 
These are made of multiple layers of extensible kraft paper of differing grammages. These are gaining popularity in the cement industry, drug and fertilizer industry where the inner or outer layer of the sacks are made of polyethylene to protect the product from moisture.

Laminated-cartons and plastic bottles 
These find use in paint industry, tetra packs containing milk, fruit juice, syrups and pharmaceutical industry. The typical combinations are as follows:

Paper/foil/LDPE
Aluminium foil/paper/LDPE
 PE/aluminium foil/paper
PET/aluminium foil/LDPE

Apart from these nylon, EVOH, EAA, PA, EVA, SiO2 plasma coatings are also used in laminates to give various functional properties. The layer combinations are selected by the engineer depending on the product characteristic, shelf life and extent of vapour transmission rate. Precooked food are packed in PS/EVOH/PE bags with PVE/PDVC/PE closures.

Coextrusion
Coextrusion is the plastic extrusion of multiple layers of material simultaneously. Such products are popularly known as CO-EX.

References 

Packaging
Food packaging
Packaging materials
Packaging industry
Retail packaging